La Roë is a commune in the Mayenne department in north-western France.

History
The Bretonic ascetic preacher Robert of Arbrissel founded a community of canons regular in 1092 which was confirmed by Pope Urban II in Angers in February 1092. This would in time turn into the development of La Roë abbey.

See also
Communes of Mayenne

References

Roe